Eugenio Barisoni (8 July 1886 – 31 March 1951) was an Italian writer. His work was part of the literature event in the art competition at the 1936 Summer Olympics.

References

External links
 

1886 births
1951 deaths
20th-century Italian male writers
Olympic competitors in art competitions
People from Novara